Jennifer Armstrong is an American politician. She is the member-elect for the 16th district of the Alaska House of Representatives.

Life and career 
Armstrong was a businessperson.

In August 2022, Armstrong defeated Joel McKinney and Richard Beckes in the non-partisan primary election for the 16th district of the Alaska House of Representatives. In November 2022, she defeated Liz Vazquez in the general election, winning 55 percent of the votes. She succeeded Ivy Spohnholz. She assumes office in 2023.

References 

Living people
Year of birth missing (living people)
Place of birth missing (living people)
Democratic Party members of the Alaska House of Representatives
21st-century American politicians
21st-century American women politicians